Koltyrikha is a rural locality (a village) in Rezhskoye Rural Settlement, Syamzhensky District, Vologda Oblast, Russia. The population was 44 as of 2002.

Geography 
Koltyrikha is located 47 km northeast of Syamzha (the district's administrative centre) by road. Lukinskaya is the nearest rural locality.

References 

Rural localities in Syamzhensky District